Thiele Highway is a road in South Australia connecting the outskirts of Adelaide to the North west bend of the Murray River at Morgan, South Australia. It is named after author Colin Thiele who lived most of his life in towns along the route, and set some of his stories in the area.

Thiele Highway branches from Horrocks Highway at Gawler Belt on the outskirts of Gawler, north of Adelaide. It goes northeast through undulating cropping country to skirt the east side of Freeling and continues to cross the Light River and enter the former mining town of Kapunda. It crosses the Light River again midway between Kapunda and Eudunda. It continues east-north-east from Eudunda down into the Murray Valley and across the plains past a number of small rural local service centres to Morgan where it meets the Murray River and Goyder Highway. Most of the route is close to the former Morgan railway line.

Major intersections

References

Highways in South Australia